Neucleus is a student newspaper published at the University of New England in Armidale, New South Wales, Australia. The magazine is produced by the University of New England Students' Association.

History 
Neucleus was established in April 1947.

Voluntary student unionism 
The implementation of voluntary student unionism in 2006 had a significant impact on the viability of student newspapers across Australia, compulsory student union membership fees having been the major source of income for most.

Post-VSU return 

After a period of six years absence, the publication returned in 2013 under the name Nucleus.

New media age 

As of 2018 the Nucleus has taken a new angle and started publishing digitally with a minimisation of print media. The 2017-18 UNESA Board of Directors in conjunction with a former editor, Nicholas McCann, helped to form this new version of the publication.

Magazine closure 

Due to budgetary restrictions and a high turn-over of editors, the magazine ceased publishing.

Student newspapers published in Australia
University of New England (Australia)
Publications established in 1947
1947 establishments in Australia